Paratriarius is a genus of skeletonizing leaf beetles in the family Chrysomelidae. There are more than 20 described species in Paratriarius. They are found in North America and the Neotropics.

Species
There are 52 species recognised in the genus Paratriarius including:

 Paratriarius azureipennis Gahan, 1891
 Paratriarius bipartitus (Baly, 1889)
 Paratriarius coccineus (Baly, 1865)
 Paratriarius cognatus (Baly, 1889)
 Paratriarius coryphaea (Baly, 1886)
 Paratriarius curtisii (Baly, 1886)
 Paratriarius denotatus (Gahan, 1891)
 Paratriarius difformis (Jacoby, 1887)
 Paratriarius dorsatus (Say, 1824)
 Paratriarius flavifrons (Jacoby, 1886)
 Paratriarius flavocinctus (Baly, 1886)
 Paratriarius flavomarginatus (Baly, 1886)
 Paratriarius limbatipennis (Baly, 1889)
 Paratriarius longitarsis (Jacoby, 1887)
 Paratriarius nicaraguensis (Jacoby, 1887)
 Paratriarius ornatus (Baly, 1859)
 Paratriarius pulcher (Baly, 1865)
 Paratriarius rugatus (Baly, 1879)
 Paratriarius smaragdinus (Jacoby, 1887)
 Paratriarius staudingeri (Baly, 1889)
 Paratriarius subimpressus (Jacoby, 1886)
 Paratriarius suturalis (Baly, 1865)
 Paratriarius triplagiatus (Baly, 1859)
 Paratriarius tropica Weise, 1916
 Paratriarius unifasciatus (Baly, 1889)
 Paratriarius zonula (Baly, 1889)

References

Further reading

 
 
 

Galerucinae
Chrysomelidae genera
Articles created by Qbugbot
Beetles of North America
Beetles of South America
Taxa named by Charles Frederic August Schaeffer